Vlastiboř is a municipality and village in Jablonec nad Nisou District in the Liberec Region of the Czech Republic. It has about 100 inhabitants.

Notable people
Jiří Malec (born 1962), ski jumper, Olympic medalist

References

Villages in Jablonec nad Nisou District